Gabo may refer to:

 Gabo (character), character in role-playing game Dragon Warrior VII
 Gabo Island, Victoria, Australia
 Gabo Pat, neighbourhood in Karachi, Pakistan
 Gabo Reform, series of reforms in Korea

People
 Nickname of Gabriel García Márquez (1927–2014), Colombian novelist, journalist, editor, publisher, political activist, and recipient of the 1982 Nobel Prize in Literature
 Naum Gabo (1890-1977), prominent Russian sculptor in the Constructivism movement

Similar spelling
 Cabo (disambiguation)